Athabasca is a provincial electoral district for the Legislative Assembly of Saskatchewan, Canada. It is located in the extreme northwest corner of the province. The major industries are tourism, mineral extraction, forestry, commercial fishing and trapping. The Cluff Lake uranium mine is located in this constituency, as well as the Athabasca Sand Dunes Provincial Park and the Clearwater River Provincial Park. The major communities are La Loche, Île-à-la-Crosse and Buffalo Narrows with populations of 2,136, 1,268 and 1,137 respectively.

The district was most recently contested in the 2020 general election, during which incumbent NDP MLA Buckley Belanger was re-elected, but a by-election is scheduled for February 15, 2022 to replace Belanger who resigned to run (unsuccessfully) for the Liberal Party of Canada in the riding of Desnethé—Missinippi—Churchill River during the 2021 Canadian federal election.

The original Athabasca electoral district was created before the 1908 general election out of parts of Battleford, Redberry, Prince Albert and Kinistino, and consisted of the sparsely populated northern half of Saskatchewan.  For the 1912 general election, the electoral district was divided in half, with the eastern half becoming Cumberland. The district's southern border was slightly altered before the 1917 general election, and was re-named Île-à-la-Crosse. Île-à-la-Crosse and Cumberland were re-joined prior to the 1934 general election, and the new combined riding was given the name Athabasca. Cumberland was split off again prior to the 1938 general election. Prior to the 1952 general election, Athabasca was shifted to the northeastern corner of the province, with most of its previous incarnation being transferred to Meadow Lake, with small parts transferred to the new Athabasca riding and Cumberland.  This arrangement lasted until the 1971 general election, when the northern half of Meadow Lake was added back to the district. Finally, prior to the 1975 general election, the riding moved back to the northwestern corner of the province, adding back most of the territory in Meadow Lake, while losing it eastern half to Cumberland. The riding has remained in this configuration ever since.

History

In 1995 Buckley Belanger was elected, winning by 159 votes. Belanger left the Liberals, putting his seat on the line to run as a New Democrat. In the by-election, he defeated the Liberal candidate by 2,050 votes (94% of the popular vote), the second-largest majority in the history of the province. Belanger was subsequently re-elected in every general election since then, most recently in 2016. He resigned in 2021 to run as a Liberal in the 2021 Canadian federal election, but failed to be elected to the federal riding of Desnethé—Missinippi—Churchill River. After his defeat, he declined to seek re-election to his provincial seat. In the subsequent by-election, the Saskatchewan Party's Jim Lemaigre, defeating NDP candidate Georgina Jolibois. This was considered an upset, as the NDP has held the predominantly-indigenous riding almost continuously since 1975.

Along with the neighbouring northern riding of Cumberland, Athabasca is considered one of the safest New Democratic seats in Saskatchewan, although candidates for the centre-right Saskatchewan Party have polled somewhat better results in the 21st century compared to SP and Progressive Conservative candidates in previous elections.

Member of the Legislative Assembly

This riding has elected the following Members of the Legislative Assembly:

Election results

Athabasca, 1934–present

 

 
 

 

^ Saskatchewan Party change compared to Progressive Conservative

Île-à-la-Crosse, 1917–1934

Athabasca, 1908–1917

^ Progressive Conservative change from Provincial Rights

References

External links
Website of the Legislative Assembly of Saskatchewan
 Saskatchewan Archives Board: Saskatchewan Executive and Legislative Directory

Saskatchewan provincial electoral districts